In differential geometry, the Cotton tensor on a (pseudo)-Riemannian manifold of dimension n is a third-order tensor concomitant of the metric. By contrast, in dimensions ,
the vanishing of the Cotton tensor is necessary but not sufficient for the metric to be conformally flat; instead, the corresponding necessary and sufficient   condition in these higher dimensions is the vanishing of the Weyl tensor, while the Cotton tensor just becomes a constant times 
the divergence of the Weyl tensor. For  the Cotton tensor is identically zero. The concept is named after Émile Cotton.

The proof of the classical result that for  the vanishing of the Cotton tensor is equivalent to the metric being conformally flat is given by Eisenhart using a standard integrability argument.

Recently, the study of three-dimensional spaces is becoming of great interest, because the Cotton tensor restricts the relation between the Ricci tensor and the energy–momentum tensor of matter in the Einstein equations and plays an important role in the Hamiltonian formalism of general relativity.

Definition 

In coordinates, and denoting the Ricci tensor by Rij and the scalar curvature by R, the components of the Cotton tensor are

The Cotton tensor can be regarded as a vector valued 2-form, and for n = 3 one can use the Hodge star operator to convert this into a second order trace free tensor density

sometimes called the Cotton–York tensor.

Properties

Conformal rescaling
Under conformal rescaling of the metric  for some scalar function . We see that the Christoffel symbols transform as

where  is the tensor

The Riemann curvature tensor transforms as

In -dimensional manifolds, we obtain the Ricci tensor by contracting the transformed Riemann tensor to see it transform as

Similarly the Ricci scalar transforms as

Combining all these facts together permits us to conclude the Cotton-York tensor transforms as

or using coordinate independent language as

where the gradient is plugged into the symmetric part of the Weyl tensor W.

Symmetries
The Cotton tensor has the following symmetries:

and therefore

In addition the Bianchi formula for the Weyl tensor can be rewritten as

where  is the positive divergence in the first component of W.

References

 A. Garcia, F.W. Hehl, C. Heinicke, A. Macias (2004) "The Cotton tensor in Riemannian spacetimes", Classical and Quantum Gravity 21: 1099–1118, Eprint arXiv:gr-qc/0309008

Riemannian geometry
Tensors in general relativity
Tensors